Mount Vernon is an unincorporated community located within Elizabeth Township, Allegheny County, Pennsylvania, United States.

References

Unincorporated communities in Allegheny County, Pennsylvania
Unincorporated communities in Pennsylvania